Liberi is a comune (municipality) in the Province of Caserta in the Italian region Campania, located about  north of Naples and about  north of Caserta.

Liberi borders the following municipalities: Alvignano, Caiazzo, Castel di Sasso, Dragoni, Pontelatone, Roccaromana.

References

Cities and towns in Campania